KARN-FM (102.9 MHz) is a commercial radio station, licensed to Sheridan, Arkansas, and serving the Little Rock metropolitan area.  It is owned by Cumulus Media and broadcasts a talk radio format.  It has long been the flagship station of the Arkansas Radio Network.  The station's studios are located on Wellington Hills Road in West Little Rock, and the transmitter tower is on North Sardis Road in Mabelvale.

Weekdays on KARN-FM begin with a local news and information show, "First News with Toby Howell and Rebecca Davis."  KARN-FM also has a local afternoon drive time talk show called "The Schmidt Show" hosted by Brad Schmidt.  The rest of the weekday schedule is nationally syndicated conservative talk shows from Chris Plante, Dan Bongino (formerly occupied by The Rush Limbaugh Show), Mark Levin, Ben Shapiro, Michael J. Knowles, "Red Eye Radio" and "America in the Morning."  Weekends feature shows on health, money, movies, law, home repair, technology, the outdoors and guns.  Weekend hosts include Kim Komando, Ben Ferguson, Joe Pags, Bill Handel and Todd Starnes.  KARN-FM has local news updates seven days a week, with world and national news from Fox News Radio.

History
For a history of the original KARN-FM, see KABZ.

The signal at 102.9 signed on the air on April 13. 1987.  It began as a Class A FM station in Sheridan, Arkansas, that did not fully cover metro Little Rock.  It found some success as a satellite-delivered oldies station known as "Q-102" KQLV.  Q-102's popularity was short-lived as struggling rock station KZLR "KZ-95" picked up the oldies format as KOLL "Cool 95."  Cool 95's signal better covered the Little Rock market while Q-102 was limited to the southern suburbs of the city.

KQLV upgraded its signal to the current 102.9 facility and switched to country music as KXIX "Kix 103."  Despite a huge promotions blitz and a massive prize giveaway, Kix 103 never cracked a 2 share in the ratings and never put any fear into country powerhouse 95.7 KSSN.

Kix 103 entered a sales agreement with KEZQ 100.3, and the two eventually swapped formats with KEZQ's soft AC format ending up on 102.9 and KXIX's country format going to 100.3 as KDDK "K-Duck 100."

KEZQ remained at 102.9 for a few years, and KURB acquired it in 1995.  Shortly afterward, the KEZQ call sign moved to 1250 AM, and 102.9 became KVLO "K-Love 102.9."  The K-Love soft AC format was the most successful music format the 102.9 frequency had, but Citadel took it country in the early 2000s as B-98.5 began transitioning from Hot AC to AC.  The country format was not much more successful than the old Kix 103 had been.

For a number of years, KARN 920 AM simulcast on two low power FM signals, including KVLO 102.5 FM licensed to Cabot, Arkansas, and KPZK 101.7 FM licensed to Humnoke, Arkansas. While both stations attracted substantial listener numbers, neither signal covered the Little Rock market well. In the summer of 2004, the decision was made to simulcast KARN full-time on the 102.9 FM frequency.

In 2007, upon merger of nearly a couple dozen ABC Radio stations, Citadel Broadcasting relinquished 11 of its radio stations, including KARN-FM, to The Last Bastion Station Trust, LLC.  However, the trust decided it would not simulcast KARN, which had remained with Citadel, on KARN-FM; Citadel then transferred KOKY to the trust instead, and re-acquired KARN-FM. Citadel merged with Cumulus Media on September 16, 2011.

Past Personalities
Generations of Arkansas broadcasters have worked at KARN, including sportscaster Jim Elder; talk show hosts Pat Lynch, Ray Lincoln, Dave Elswick, "Big Dave" Medford, Doc Washburn, Bob Harrison, Taylor Carr, Rex Nelson, and Sharon Lee; farm broadcasters Bob Buice, Lowell Ruffcorn, John Philpot, Stewart Doan, Janet Adkison and Keith Merckx (who also spent time as a news reporter and anchor); and newscasters Don Corbett, Vern Beachy, Scott Crowder, Michael Hibblen, Scott Charton, Rita Richardson, Ron Breeding, Don Griffin, Barry Green, David Wallace, Ken Miller, Paula Cooper, Terry Easley, Jayson Rogers, Grant Merrill, Alan Caudle, Patrick Grant, "Ugly" Ed Johnson and Jack Heinritz.

References

External links
KARNNewsRadio.com Official Website

ARN-FM
News and talk radio stations in the United States
Cumulus Media radio stations
Radio stations established in 1987
1987 establishments in Arkansas